Dona Bertarelli (also known as Donata Guichard Bertarelli, Donata Bertarelli Späth, Donata Bertarelli Spaeth) (born 1968) is a Swiss businesswoman of Italian origin. She is co-president of the Bertarelli Foundation. She is also a sailor, having won the 2010 Bol d’Or Mirabaud and, with her team Spindrift Racing, the Rolex Fastnet in 2013. In the same year, she and her team also broke the record for the America Discovery Route. In 2020, she became an adviser to UNCTAD.

Childhood and education
Bertarelli was born in Rome in 1968. She is the daughter of Fabio Bertarelli. She and her brother Ernesto inherited Serono, a biotechnology company. Serono was founded in 1906 in Rome and was the building block of the family's wealth. The family now has a number of activities and investments, with interests in areas such as finance, real estate, health, sports, hospitality or agriculture. According to the magazine Forbes, in 2011 the family ranked as the 81st worldwide in terms of wealth.

Bertarelli has a BSc from Boston University’s College of Communication.

Business
Bertarelli was active in Serono, the family business, and from 1992 to 1997 was Executive Director, Public and Professional Affairs, where she established the Serono Symposi and the Serono Foundation. The company was sold to Merck KGaA at the beginning of 2007.

The five star Grand Hôtel Park in Gstaad was taken over by Bertarelli in 2003. Bertarelli appointed hotelier Grace Leo as CEO of Ledunfly Hospitality in March 2017.

In 2020 she became a special adviser to UNCTAD in June 2020.

Philanthropy
After her father died, in 1999 Bertarelli and her brother founded the Bertarelli Foundation to promote the sharing and development of scientific, social and economic knowledge in the field of infertility. For ten years, Bertarelli was Chairman of the Foundation.

An article on the need for blue recovery sustainability, for which Bertarelli was co-author, was published in July 2020. Mukhisa Kituyi, Secretary-General of UNCTAD and Berarelli encouraged countries around the world to explore and expand the "Blue economy" a month later. In November 2020, Bertarelli praised the decision to protect the waters of the archipelago, which was made by the Island Council of Tristan da Cunha.

In 2021, the Bertarelli Rare Cancers Fund supported USD 15 million in research projects and community building.

Bertarelli is an ambassador for the Swiss transfusion charity Ma Vie Ton Sang  and is a supporter of the World Health Organization’s ‘Go Red for Women’ campaign. She is also a godmother to the Womanity charity (formerly Smiling Children).

Sailing
Bertarelli is an avid sailor and since 2007 has raced with her team, Spindrift Racing, in the monotype multihull regattas on Lake Léman with her Décision 35 catamaran, Ladycat. Bertarelli and her team won the Bol d’Or Mirabaud in 2010. Bertarelli was the first helmswoman to win this race since its inception in 1939.

In January 2013, Bertarelli bought a Maxi Trimaran called Maxi Banque Populaire V for her Spindrift racing team. In the same year, and with the boat now named Maxi Spindrift 2, she co-skippered the team to victory in the 45th Rolex Fastnet and also set a new record for the America Discovery Route, beating the time set by Franck Cammas in 2007 by more than 20 hours.

In August 2015, Dona Bertarelli's Spindrift 2 defended her title by taking line honors at the 46th Rolex Fastnet race.  Later that year, on 22 November, Dona Bertarelli, with Yann Guichard and their crew, left Ushant (a French island off the northwest corner of Brittany) on Spindrift 2, attempting to break the record for a crewed non-stop circumnavigation (the Jules Verne Trophy). While they did not break the record, Bertarelli became the fastest woman to sail around the world.

References

1968 births
Living people
Businesspeople in the pharmaceutical industry
Italian sailors
Swiss businesspeople
Italian billionaires
Businesspeople from Rome